Padini Holdings Berhad is a Malaysia-based investment holding company. The company sells both men's and ladies’ shoes and accessories, garments, ancillary products, children’s garments, maternity wear and accessories through various subsidiaries. Its most prominent brands are Padini and VINCCI. Its goods are exported to mainly the Middle East and Southeast Asian countries.

Background
Its goods are sold in retail flagship stores and concept stores. The Padini Concept Store is a concept which houses all Padini Holdings brands under one roof or “one-stop-shopping”. The first of such outlets was opened in Johor Bahru City Square, Johor Bahru, Malaysia in 1999. Padini Holdings Bhd focuses on fast retailing, where new products come online within weeks. Currently, its stores are scattered all around the country boasting store locations in Pavilion Kuala Lumpur and Mid Valley Megamall.

History
Padini began operations as Hwayo Garments Manufacturers Company in 1971, it was affiliated in garment manufacturing and wholesaling. It entered the retail industry in 1975 with flagship brand Padini. VINCCI was established to market ladies shoes, bags, belts and other accessories in 1986. Many brands including MIKI, SEED, ROPÉ, P & Co. and PADINI AUTHENTICS labels were launched in the following decades.

In 1991, Home Stores Sdn Bhd was launched to hold all the companies involved in the Group's retail, wholesale and manufacturing businesses. It was subsequently renamed to the present Padini Holdings a year later. In 1995, Padini Holdings Sdn Bhd was converted to a public company limited by shares and adopted the name, Padini Holdings Berhad and soon listed on the Second Board of the then Kuala Lumpur Stock Exchange.

The year 2000 witnessed the establishment of Padini Dot Com Sdn Bhd to provide electronic business services and solutions for the Group. Padini Holdings was transferred to the Main Board of the KLCI Bursa Malaysia in 2005.

Prominent brands

VINCCI
The most prominent brand under the Padini family in Malaysia. A footwear brand, most of its shoes are made from synthetic material. It also sells watches, sunglasses, PVC handbags and bead accessories.

MIKI
The two brands under the MIKI flag are MIKI Kids and MIKI Maternity. MIKI Kids are designed for toddlers while Miki Maternity is designed for stylish mums-to-be. Polyester spandex, poly rayon spandex, cotton poplin and cotton nylon are among the materials used.

SEED
SEED focuses on urban office-wear for the masses. The clothes under this line are usually jackets, coats, suits, office pants and knee-length skirts.

Padini Authentics
This brand focuses on quality casual wear, targeting the teenagers segment in the market. It sells pullovers, jackets, shirts and a variety of denim, khakis and knitwear.

Subsidiaries
Its principal subsidiaries include: Vincci Ladies’ Specialties Centre Sdn. Bhd, Padini Corporation Sdn. Bhd., Seed Corporation Sdn. Bhd., Yee Fong Hung (Malaysia) Sendirian Berhad, Mikihouse Children’s Wear Sdn. Bhd., Vincci Holdings Sdn. Bhd., Padini Dot Com Sdn. Bhd., The New World Garment Manufacturers Sdn. Bhd., and Padini International Limited.

See also
BONIA
Parkson

References 

1975 establishments in Malaysia
Companies based in Kuala Lumpur
Holding companies established in 1975
Retail companies of Malaysia
Malaysian brands
Companies listed on Bursa Malaysia
Retail companies established in 1975
Malaysian companies established in 1975